Haworthiopsis attenuata, formerly Haworthia attenuata, commonly known as zebra haworthia, is a small species of succulent plant from the Eastern Cape Province, South Africa. As an ornamental, it is one of the most commonly cultivated of the Haworthiopsis species.

Description
 
It is an evergreen succulent plant with short leaves arranged in rosettes 6–12 cm in diameter. The succulent leaves are tapered ("attenuata" means "tapering") and have bands of white tubercles on them. The species subdivides and offsets readily; in the wild it forms large clumps. It is popular as a house plant, due to its resistance to drought and general hardiness.

It is frequently confused with the rarer Haworthiopsis fasciata, to which it looks very similar. However Haworthiopsis attenuata can easily be distinguished by its white tubercles, which occur on both upper and lower sides of its leaves (H. fasciata has tubercles only on the underside, with a smooth upper surface of its leaves). A fundamental distinction is that H. attenuata's leaves are not fibrous. In addition, the leaves of H.attenuata are often (though not always) longer, thinner, and more splayed out.

Care
Like most succulents, Haworthiopsis attenuata prefer soil with adequate drainage, such as cactus mix or fast-draining potting soil mixed with sand. They like bright light, but too much direct sunlight can cause leaves to turn white or yellow. The plants should be watered evenly and generously during the summer, allowing the soil to dry out between watering. In the winter, they can be watered as infrequently as once every two weeks.

Their flowers appear in November and December.

Varieties
It is a variable species, and has several subspecies, including the "type" variety Haworthiopsis attenuata var. attenuata.

Another common variety is Haworthiopsis attenuata var. radula - Hankey Dwarf Aloe (previously considered a separate species) which has longer, more elongated, scabrid leaves with smaller, more numerous tubercles. This variation grows up to 6 inches (15 cm) in diameter and up to 6 inches (15 cm) tall.

The form clariperla has its tubercles connected into large white "bands" across the underside of its leaves, and variety britteniana has especially big and separate white tubercles.

The variety H. attenuata var. glabrata is frequently considered a separate species, H. glabrata.

References

attenuata
Flora of the Cape Provinces